Sir Michael Sydney Perry  (born 26 February 1934) is a British businessman who was Chairman of Centrica Plc. from 1997 until 10 May 2004. He is currently on the Business Advisory Forum of Oxford Said Business School.

Perry is the son of  Lt Cdr Sydney Albert Perry  and Jessie Kate Brooker. He married Joan Mary Stallard and has a son and two daughters.

He was knighted in 1977. He was appointed an Officer of the Order of the British Empire (OBE) in 1978, a Commander of the order (CBE) in 1990 and a Knight Grand Cross of the order (GBE) in 2002.

Arms

References

1934 births
Living people
British chief executives in the energy industry
Businesspeople awarded knighthoods
Fellows of St John's College, Oxford
Knights Bachelor
Knights Grand Cross of the Order of the British Empire